Big Brother Brasil 11 is the eleventh season of Big Brother Brasil, which premiered January 11, 2011 with the season finale airing March 29, 2011 on the Rede Globo television network.
 
The show is produced by Endemol Globo and presented by news reporter Pedro Bial. The season was officially confirmed since 2008 as part of a millionaire contract between international Endemol and Rede Globo. The prize award will be R$1,500,000 without tax allowances.

Actress Maria Melillo won the competition and the grand prize of R$1,500,000, while runner-up Wesley Schunk and third-place finisher Daniel Rolim walked away with R$150,000 and R$50,000 respectively.

Production

Cast

Applications were due by September 10, 2010 until October 31, 2010. Initially, the process was set to start September 1, 2010 but was postponed to avoid an eventual confusion with the premiere of the second season of Hipertensão, another Rede Globo reality television show.

Semi-finalist interviews were held in November 2010 and the final casting interviews took place in early December 2010. There were nineteen housemates competing for the grand prize: ten women and nine men.

The first housemate, a woman, was officially chosen on October 10, 2010, but did not have their identity revealed. Producers reported that she was chosen in virtual chat, which happened at the show's official website. VH1's alumni Marcia Brazil from Rock of Love Bus with Bret Michaels, Charm School with Ricki Lake and I Love Money has also applied to be on the show.

The House

According to the producers, the Big Brother House passed by the biggest reform in history, with the entire structure being redesigned for the new season.

Big Brother divided the housemates into four teams. Two of them (the Orange team and the Green team) enjoyed the luxury and comfort of the new mansion, which had two floors. The other two teams (the Red team and the Blue team) stayed in the other side, which lack beds, food and structure for any activity.

At the end of the week five, the teams dissolved, and the remaining twelve housemates were divided into two groups, one would live at the Rich House and the other would have to live at the Poor House.

The Game

Saboteur
Each week, one of the housemates is chosen by internet poll to be the Big Brother Saboteur. The saboteur had the goal to disrupt life in the House and cause as much havoc as possible. The production crew chooses the mission, and if the saboteur does it successfully, he/she would win R$10,000.

Results

: Diogo managed to lock the Poor House's door with a padlock but his identity was uncovered after he dropped its key in front of Cristiano.

Glass House

On day 23, Big Brother brought back the Glass House (BBB Bubble), which first appeared in the ninth season of the show. This time, the house confined the first five evicted housemates (Ariadna, Mauricio, Rodrigo, Michelly and Igor) for a new shot to win the game. The public had to choose just one of the contestant to return to the program. Mauricio was elected and returned to the game on day 27.

Horror Room

On day 42, as common on Monday nights, there was a joke. The consequence for the most voted housemates in it (Diana, Paula) was to face the Horror room. In this room, they should find two keys, among two thousands scattered in the floor, that would open the two existing locks. Diana and Paula should compete that mission in 10 hours. If they could not perform it, they should decide which of the two would be the first nominated. If they did not, this week's HoH (in this case, Maria) would decide which of them would be nominated. For the housemates in the house, host Pedro Bial said that each side of the house (main house and poor house) should come to a consensus and choose which ones would offer to be nominated. Talula volunteered to be the choice from main house and Janaina volunteered to be from the poor house. If girls in the Horror room concluded the task, they should choose either Janaina and Talula to be nominated. After about an hour and a half, Diana and Paula were able to complete the mission and were released from the room. Later, they decided to nominate Janaina.

Double Eviction Night

The first round of nominations in the third week featured the second double eviction in Big Brother Brasil history, with a female and a male evictees leaving the House on day 20. Housemates Michelly and Rodrigo were both eliminated in a surprise eviction, after losing individual mas first implemented on the third season of the show.

On day 43, Big Brother bosses have revealed that two of week 7's three nominated housemates would leave the house in another double eviction, which took place on day 50 in a regular eviction night. Diogo and Janaina, who received the highest percentages of the public vote (44% and 33% respectively) were both eliminated in a match against Paula. This concept is a first in the Brazilian series.

Housemates
The cast list was unveiled on January 4, 2011.

(ages stated at time of contest)

Future Appearances

In 2021, Ariadna Thalia appeared in No Limite 5, she finished the competition in 14th place.

Voting History
 Key
  – Red team
  – Blue team
  – Orange team
  – Green team

Notes
 Note 1:  During the launch night, the housemates had to vote for one person who they wanted to evict. What they didn't know was that the housemate with the most votes would not be evicted but would actually gain immunity from the first eviction. Michelly received the most votes with 5 and won immunity from the first eviction.
 Note 2:  During the first week when a housemate of a team wins Head of Household, the other housemate of the same team will also be immune from eviction along with the Head of Household.
 Note 3: Rodrigão answered the Big Phone was informed that he should be choose one housemate to be automatically nominated for eviction on Sunday and keep it as a secret. He nominated Lucival and, therefore, he was banned from nominating with the other housemates.
 Note 4: Mauricio answered the Big Phone and was instructed to send a housemate to the solitary for 17 hours. He chose Michelly.
 Note 5: Natalia, the Head of Household, had to choose a member of her team to win won immunity from the second eviction. She chose Igor.
 Note 6: Diogo and Michelly received the most nominations with 4 each. Natalia, the Head of Household, had the casting vote and chose Diogo to be the 2nd nominee.
 Note 7: Natalia answered the Big Phone and won free ice cream for her and two friends.
 Note 8: The first round of nominations in the third week featured a double eviction. Igor, the Head of Household, had to automatically nominate a male and a female housemate, he chose Maria and Rodrigo to be the nominees. Then, each Housemate had to nominate a male and a female. Rodrigão received the most nominations with 7 and Michelly the most out of the females with 5.
 Note 9:  Unknown to the housemates Adriana and Wesley received immunity for their first week in the game.
 Note 10: Adriana answered the Big Phone was informed that she should be choose one housemate to be automatically nominated for eviction. She nominated Diana.
 Note 11: Rodrigão answered the Big Phone and was automatically nominated for eviction.
 Note 12: Diana, Janaina and Wesley received the most nominations with 3 each. Maria, the Head of Household, had the casting vote and chose Wesley to be the 3rd nominee.
 Note 13: Janaina was automatically nominated for eviction by Diana and Paula, who survived the Horror Room.
 Note 14: Jaqueline answered the Big Phone and was informed that she should choose two housemates to wear Hawaiian necklaces until the vote. Diana and Wesley were her choices. On Sunday, she chose Wesley to be automatically nominated for eviction.
 Note 15: Diana won the eighth Power of Immunity competition. However, there was a twist (not known by the housemates) in which the winner, rather than immunize another housemate, would be immunized.
 Note 16: Daniel and Mauricio received the most nominations with 3 each. Rodrigão, the Head of Household, had the casting vote and chose Daniel to be the 3rd nominee.
 Note 17: Daniel answered the Big Phone was informed that he should be choose one housemate to be automatically nominated for eviction. He nominated Mauricio.
 Note 18: Rodrigão and Wesley received the most nominations with 2 each. Daniel, the Head of Household, had the casting vote and chose Rodrigão to be the 2nd nominee.
 Note 19: Jaqueline and Rodrigão had to choose a 3rd person to nominate for eviction, as they were already up. They chose Wesley.
 Note 20: Maria answered the Big Phone was informed that she should be choose one housemate to be automatically nominated for eviction. She nominated Paula.
 Note 21: The second round of nominations in the tenth week didn't have an actual vote. After winning the Head of Household competition, Wesley was instructed to save one contestant, automatically nominating the other 3 for eviction. He chose to save Maria, putting Daniel, Diana and Rodrigão up for eviction.
 Note 22: Daniel won the final Head of Household competition. Therefore, Diana, Maria and Wesley were automatically nominated for eviction by default.

Have and Have-Nots

References

External links
 Official Site 

2011 Brazilian television seasons
11